The Francis J. Dewes House is a house located at 503 West Wrightwood Avenue in Chicago, Illinois, United States. The house was built in 1896 by Adolph Cudell and Arthur Hercz for brewer Francis J. Dewes. It was added to the National Register of Historic Places on August 14, 1973 and designated a Chicago Landmark on June 12, 1974. The building's exterior is designed in a Central European Baroque Revival style. 

The mansion went for sale in 2011 with an asking price of $9.9 million. It never sold and is currently owned by Structure Management Midwest, a property management firm. In 2013, its owner, Fred Latsko, listed it for $12.5 million.

References

External links

Houses completed in 1896
Houses on the National Register of Historic Places in Chicago
Chicago Landmarks